Vendegies-sur-Écaillon is a commune in the Nord department in northern France.

History
In his memoir of World War I, A S Bullock recalls the night of 24 October 1918 when he was among the reserves helping the Gloucestershire Regiment in a final push against the Germans at Vendegies-sur-Écaillon. He notes that although 'maps were scarce', he managed not only to obtain one but to retain it after the war, complete with mud from the battlefield.

Bullock recalls marching on from Vendegies-sur-Écaillon to Sepmeries, where on 27 October he narrowly escaped death at a spot in square Q12 of this same map.

Heraldry

See also
Communes of the Nord department

References

Vendegiessurecaillon